Barbad Award is a statue awarded to the winners of the competitive section of Iran's most prestigious music festival, the Fajr International Music festival. This award was added to the festival from the 31st Fajr Music Festival.

Winners

31st Fajr International Music Festival (2016) 
source:
Ardeshir Kamkar
Alireza Ghorbani
Hooshang Kamkar
Tahmoures Pournazeri
Homayoun Shajarian
Amin Honarmand
Shahrdad Rohani
Mohsen Sharifian
Darkoob Band
Chaartaar
Behrouz Saffarian
Sohrab Mohammadi

32nd Fajr International Music Festival (2017) 
source:
Navid Dehghan
Mehdi Shahsavar
Behzad Ravaghi
Shervin Mohajer
Mahyar Alizadeh
Peyman Soltani
Alireza Mashayekhi
Hamzeh Yeganeh
Ashkan Maheri
Mohsen Chavoshi
Reza Aryaee
Mahbod Shafinejad
Alireza Ghorbani
Homayoun Shajarian

33rd Fajr International Music Festival (2018) 
source:
Majid Mowlania
Ghasem Rahimzadeh
Karen Keyhani
Alireza Mashayekhi
Milad Derakhshani
Golnoosh Salehi
Mehdi Yarrahi
Kaveh Yaghmaei
Reza Aryaee
Kaveh Salehi
Alireza Ghorbani

36th Fajr International Music Festival (2021)
source: 
Kaveh Mirhosseini
Hamzeh Moghaddam
Abolhasan khoshroo
Houshmand Ebadi
Bahman Faryadras
Mojtaba Asgari
Mostafa Ghanaat
Damahi Band
Pouya Kolahi
Amir Pourkhalaji
Vahid Taj
Mahour (Label)

References 

Performing arts trophies
Music awards
Music festivals in Iran